Thirty Seconds Over Tokyo is a 1944 American war film produced by Metro-Goldwyn-Mayer. The screenplay by Dalton Trumbo is based on the 1943 book of the same name by Captain Ted W. Lawson. Lawson was a pilot on the historic Doolittle Raid, America's first retaliatory air strike against Japan, four months after the December 7, 1941, Japanese attack on Pearl Harbor. The raid was planned, led by, and named after United States Army Air Forces Lieutenant Colonel James Doolittle, who was promoted two ranks, to Brigadier General, the day after the raid.

Sam Zimbalist was the film's producer and Mervyn LeRoy directed. The picture stars Van Johnson as Lawson; Phyllis Thaxter as his wife, Ellen; Robert Walker as Corporal David Thatcher; Robert Mitchum as Lieutenant Bob Gray; and Spencer Tracy as Lieutenant Colonel—and soon General— Jimmy Doolittle.
Tracy's appearance in the film is more in the nature of a guest star; he receives special billing rather than his usual top billing and has considerably less screen time than star Van Johnson.

In the book, Lawson gives an eyewitness account of the intensive training, the mission, and the aftermath as experienced by his crew and by others who flew the mission on April 18, 1942. Lawson piloted "The Ruptured Duck", the seventh of 16 B-25s to take off from the aircraft carrier USS Hornet. The film depicted the raid accurately and used actual wartime footage of the bombers.

Plot

Not long after the Pearl Harbor attack, United States Army Air Forces  Lieutenant Colonel James Doolittle orders 24 North American B-25 Mitchell medium bombers—with volunteer crews—to report to Eglin Field, Florida, for a secret three-month-long mission. They arrive on March 1. Among them is the craft piloted by Ted Lawson. His crew consists of Lt. Dean Davenport, co-pilot; Lt. Charles McClure, navigator, Lt. Bob Clever, bombardier, and Corporal David Thatcher, gunner-mechanic.

Doolittle warns them: This work is top-secret. He offers them the chance to opt out, particularly if they have wives and families. Lawson's wife, Ellen, drives to Eglin Field to join him. She is pregnant. They are very much in love, but giving up never occurs to them.

The intensive training includes learning how to take off on a runway only 500 feet long as taught by an instructor Naval Aviator from nearby Pensacola Naval Air Station. They are not told why, and those who guess keep quiet. Lawson's plane acquires the nickname "Ruptured Duck" and nose art to match. One dark morning, Lieutenant Colonel Doolittle sends them off to fly cross-country at hedge-hopping height to Naval Air Station Alameda, California. The planes are immediately loaded aboard the aircraft carrier .

At last, Doolittle reveals the mission: Bomb Tokyo, Yokohama, Osaka, Kobe and Nagoya. The carrier will get them within 400 miles of mainland Japan. After dropping their payloads, they will continue to designated landing spots in parts of China controlled by Nationalist forces and regroup in Chungking.

The next day, they learn about takeoff procedures: If a plane malfunctions, it will be pushed over the side. Lt. Jurika works with each crew on its own bombing run. At the penultimate briefing, Doolittle warns that any man who cannot cope with the unavoidable killing of civilians should drop out, without shame.

The call to battle stations comes twice daily, at dawn and dusk, when the enemy "pig boats" (submarines) come up. When an enemy surface vessel does discover the convoy, the crews assemble to take off immediately—12 hours earlier than planned. It will be daylight over Japan and night when they reach China. Doolittle leads the raid, dropping incendiary bombs to mark key targets. The Ruptured Duck is the seventh flight. Flying low over the ocean and into Tokyo, through the smoke of burning targets, dropping their bombs as planned. Flak bursts around them, but fighters ignore them.

Lawson crashes in the surf while trying to land on a beach in darkness and heavy rain. Everyone but Thatcher is badly injured. Lawson's left leg is laid open to the bone, and McClure's shoulders are broken. Friendly Chinese help them, and the Americans face hardships and danger while being escorted through Japanese-held territory. In the absence of any medical supplies, the injured men endure terrible pain, and Lawson's leg becomes infected. He dreams of Ellen.

There is a Red Cross banner in the village of XingMing. Doctor Chung arrives with good news and bad. He will take them to his father's hospital, some 19 miles farther. The bad news is that the Japanese have captured an American crew. Hurrying into the hills, they look back: XingMing is burning.

There is no surgeon at the elder Dr. Chung's hospital, but Lt. Smith's crew is on its way with Lt. "Doc" White, who volunteered as gunner. The Japanese approach, and the able-bodied Americans leave, except for Doc. He takes Lawson's leg off well above the knee, using the single dose of spinal anesthesia in their possession. It wears off too soon.  Lawson passes out and dreams of Ellen.

Cut to a chorus of Scouts singing "The Star-Spangled Banner", in Mandarin, celebrating Lawson's first day out of bed. His forehead shows a tracery of scars. When Dr. Chung senior gives Lawson an heirloom bracelet for his wife, Lawson is puzzled. He does not remember talking about her. When he totters on his crutches, he becomes distraught at the idea of Ellen seeing him like this. They hurry to Ch'ang Chou to rendezvous with an American plane that takes them home.

General Doolittle calls Ellen. Sobbing with joy, she tells her mother why Ted refuses to see her:  "As if that would matter!" Doolittle visits Lawson in the hospital and tells him he has work for him to do. When Ellen comes in, Lawson, overjoyed, forgets his missing leg and stands. He falls and they embrace on the floor, all smiles. "When things were the worst...I could see your face, your beautiful face." he says. "I knew you were coming home, Ted", Ellen declares.

Cast

 Van Johnson as Captain Ted W. Lawson, Pilot of The Ruptured Duck
 Robert Walker as Corporal David Thatcher, gunner-mechanic.
 Tim Murdock as Lt. Dean Davenport, co-pilot
 Don DeFore as Lt. Charles McClure, navigator
 Gordon McDonald as Lt. Bob Clever, bombardier
 Phyllis Thaxter as Ellen Lawson
 Stephen McNally as Lt. Thomas "Doc" White, gunner on Lt. Smith's plane.
 Spencer Tracy as Lieutenant Colonel and then Brigadier General Jimmy Doolittle
 John R. Reilly as Lt. Jacob "Shorty" Manch
 Robert Mitchum as Lt. Bob Gray
 Scott McKay as Captain David M. "Davey" Jones
 Donald Curtis as Lt. Randall
 Louis Jean Heydt as Navy Lieutenant Henry Miller
 William "Bill" Phillips as Lt. Don Smith
 Douglas Cowan as Lt. Everett "Brick" Holstrom
 Paul Langton as Captain "Ski" York
 Leon Ames as Lt. Jurika
 Bill Williams as Bud Felton
 Robert Bice as "Jig" White
 Hsin Kung as Dr. Chung
 Benson Fong as Young Dr. Chung
 Ching Wah Lee as Guerilla Charlie
 Alan Napier as Mr. Parker
 Ann Shoemaker as Mrs. Parker
 Dorothy Morris as Jane
 Jacqueline White as Emmy York
 Selena Royle as Mrs. Reynolds
 John Dehner as Lieutenant Commander (uncredited)
 Blake Edwards as Lt. Smith's crewman (uncredited)

Cast notes
Phyllis Thaxter, Tim Murdock, Steve Brodie, and Robert Mitchum made their screen debuts in this film.

Production
There is an error in the onscreen credits, perpetuated in many sources, including the Variety review. They list Ted W. Lawson and Robert Considine as authors of both "the book" and a "story" in Collier's magazine. There was no such story. Lawson was the sole author of the book Thirty Seconds Over Tokyo, and the word "Collier's" was crossed off in the credits of the copyright cutting continuity.

The film is known for its accurate depiction of the raid and use of actual wartime footage of the bombing aircraft. The production crew worked closely with Captain Ted Lawson and other members of the raid to make the film as realistic as possible. Filming at Hurlburt Field and Peel Field near Mary Esther, Florida, and Eglin Field (the actual base where the Doolittle Raiders trained), and operational USAAF B-25C and B-25D bombers were used (closely resembling the B-25B Mitchells used in 1942). Auxiliary Field 4, Peel Field, was used for the short-distance take off practice scenes.

Dean Davenport was a technical adviser and stunt flyer for the film. He flew a B-25 bomber off a pier in Santa Monica, Calif., for a scene showing the takeoffs from the Hornet.

Although an aircraft carrier was not available, due to wartime needs (USS Hornet itself had been sunk in the Battle of the Santa Cruz Islands on October 27, 1942 only six months after launching the raid), a mix of realistic studio sets and original newsreel footage recreated the USS Hornet scenes. Principal photography took place between February and June 1944.

Reception
The film received favorable reviews. Look magazine praised it as one of the five best films of the year, and the National Board of Review ranked it as eighth-best film of the year. The Hollywood Reporter reviewer called it "one of the greatest war pictures ever made".

Thirty Seconds Over Tokyo was recognized as an inspirational, patriotic film with great value as a morale builder for wartime audiences. The New York Times in 1944 summed the production, "our first sensational raid on Japan in April 1942 is told with magnificent integrity and dramatic eloquence." Variety focused on the human elements, "inspired casting ... the war becomes a highly personalized thing through the actions of these crew members...this pleasant little family."

Later reviewers have considered Thirty Seconds Over Tokyo the finest aviation film of the period. The film is now considered a "classic aviation and war film." The actual Raiders considered it a worthy tribute.

Box-office
According to MGM records, the film made $4,297,000 in the US and Canada and $1,950,000 elsewhere, resulting in a profit of $1,382,000.

Awards and honors
In the 1945 Academy Awards, the Thirty Seconds Over Tokyo team of A. Arnold Gillespie, Donald Jahraus and Warren Newcombe (photography) and Douglas Shearer (sound) won the Oscar for Best Special Effects. Robert Surtees, A.S.C. and Harold Rosson, A.S.C. were  nominated in the category of Black and White Cinematography.

American Film Institute lists:
 AFI's 100 Years...100 Movies - Nominated
 AFI's 100 Years...100 Heroes and Villains:
 Lt. Colonel James H. Doolittle - Nominated Hero
 AFI's 100 Years...100 Cheers - Nominated

In popular culture
 Thirty Seconds Over Tokyo star Van Johnson appeared in a 1970 commercial for Post Fortified Oat Flakes breakfast cereal on a set evoking an aircraft carrier flight deck with B-25s on board. He ended  with the line that the cereal would "take me to Tokyo – and back!"
Jefferson Airplane's second live album, Thirty Seconds Over Winterland (1973), and experimental rock band Pere Ubu's 1975 debut single, "30 Seconds Over Tokyo", are named after the film. 
The film The Purple Heart (1944) is a fictionalized account of the fates of American airmen from the Doolittle raid who are placed on trial in a Japanese court. 
The film Pearl Harbor (2001) includes a fictionalized version of the raid.
The opening scene of the film Midway (1976) uses footage from Thirty Seconds Over Tokyo to launch the film's plot with the Doolittle Raid.
In the Seinfeld season 3 episode "The Keys", Kramer mentions to Jerry that he is watching the film.
Thirty Seconds Over Tokyo inspired The Simpsons episode "Thirty Minutes over Tokyo".

References
Informational notes

Citations

Bibliography
 Dolan, Edward F. Jr. Hollywood Goes to War. London: Bison Books, 1985. .
 Glines, Carroll V. The Doolittle Raid: America's Daring First Strike Against Japan. New York: Orion Books, 1988. 
 Harwick, Jack and Ed Schnepf. "A Viewer's Guide to Aviation Movies". The Making of the Great Aviation Films, General Aviation Series, Volume 2, 1989.
 Orriss, Bruce. When Hollywood Ruled the Skies: The Aviation Film Classics of World War II. Hawthorne, California: Aero Associates Inc., 1984. .

External links

The book Thirty Seconds Over Tokyo may be borrowed from the Internet Archive
 Official Website of the Doolittle Raiders	
Children of the Doolittle Raiders

1944 films
1944 war films
American aviation films
American black-and-white films
American World War II propaganda films
1940s English-language films
Films scored by Herbert Stothart
Films about the Doolittle Raid
Films about shot-down aviators
Films about the United States Army Air Forces
Films directed by Mervyn LeRoy
Films set on airplanes
Films that won the Best Visual Effects Academy Award
Metro-Goldwyn-Mayer films
Films with screenplays by Dalton Trumbo
Films about the United States Navy in World War II
World War II films based on actual events
World War II aviation films
Films set in 1942
Films set in Florida
Films set on aircraft carriers
Films set in California